Gulbongsan Station is a railway station on the Gyeongchun Line in Namsan-myeon, Chuncheon-si, Gangwon-do, South Korea. Its station subname is Jade Garden where Jade Garden is located about 4 km away from the station, and a free shuttle bus runs every hour.

Before upgrading to double track, the Mugunghwa trains while stopping around several times a day. On December 21, 2010, after the double track was completed, the station was renamed to Gulbongsan station and as it was replaced by a commuter train, the Mugunghwa train no longer operates.

Station Name
Original Seocheon Station is located in 230 Seocheon-ri, Namsan-myeon, Chuncheon-gun, but practitioners in that name  located in Seocheon, South Chungcheong Province and to pronounce avoid confusion, the same as the Gyeonggi and Gangwon Province the station was renamed as Gyeonggang (Gyeonggi + Gangwon) station, which means the point where meets.

In 2010, when the Seoul Metropolitan Subway started, the station was renamed to Gulbongsan station, with the opening of 395m above sea level in the nearby caves Bongsan.

Station Layout

References

Seoul Metropolitan Subway stations
Metro stations in Chuncheon
Railway stations opened in 1939